The Northwestern University Dental School closed in 2001, 110 years after opening in 1891. Its first dean was Edgar Swain. According to the trustees, the mentioned financial stresses and reputation as reasons for the closure of the program.

History
The school was initially located on South State Street and then eventually moved into the new Medical School buildings on South Dearborn and East 24th in 1893. In 1895, Northwestern University bought the American College of Dental Surgery and merged the two schools into one. After Swain retired as the dean in 1897, G. V. Black took over the position. He served as the Professor of Pathology before his appointment. After becoming the dean, he worked to re-organize the curriculum of the dental school. In 1902, the Dental School was moved to the corner of the Lake and Dearborn Streets, along with the Pharmacy and the Law Schools after the university purchased the building of Tremont Hotel.

Thomas Lewis Gilmer became the next dean after Black died. Arthur D. Black, son of G. V. Black, became the fourth dean of the dental school after Gilmer's retirement in 1918. Arthur Black was instrumental in organizing the World Dental Congress along with the Century of Progress Fair in Chicago in 1933. Under Arthur Black the dental school moved to the Montgomery Ward Memorial. After Black died of Pneumonia, Charles W. Freeman became the next Dean in 1938 and served till 1953. Freeman was noted to create one of the first centers for dental research at the Dental School. In addition, he promoted the foreign student program, and established the Cleft Palate Institute involving the dental, medical, and speech schools. After Freeman retired, George W. Teuscher was appointed the next dean and served the position until 1971. In 1972, Norman Olsen became the next dean. Olsen retired in 1995 and the next dean was Michael Heuer who in December, 1997 announced the closing of the Dental School as dictated by the university board of trustees and president.

Achievements
 First Post Doctoral Degree in Dentistry, 1922
 First Graduate Program in Pediatric Dentistry, 1935
 One of the First Graduate Orthodontic Programs
 Founding place of Omicron Kappa Upsilon Dental Honor Society, 1914
 Founding place of Sigma Pi Alpha Dental Hygiene Honor Society, 1951
 First use of Procaine in mandibular anesthesia in America
 Discovering place of Gardol which is a plaque preventative used in Toothpastes and mouthwashes.

Alumni
 John Howard Furby, Orthodontics
 Frederick Bogue Noyes, Orthodontics
 Lee Graber, Orthodontics
 Thomas M. Graber, Orthodontics
 Hayes Nance, Orthodontics
 Bailey Jacobson, Orthodontics
 A. Richard Goldman, Head Neck and Facial Pain
Miles Dewey Davis, Jr., father of jazz trumpeter Miles Davis
William Thomas Jefferson, first Black dentist to practice dentistry in the United States Army

Notable faculty
 Dean Harold Noyes
 Greene Vardiman Black
 Joseph Jarabak
 Thomas Gilmer
 Arthur D. Black
 Charles W. Freeman
 George W. Teuscher
 Norman Olsen
 Edward Angle
 E Allen Bishop

References

Educational institutions established in 1891
Educational institutions disestablished in 2001
Defunct private universities and colleges in Illinois
Dental School
Dental schools in Illinois
1891 establishments in Illinois